Gosnold is a town that encompasses the Elizabeth Islands in Dukes County, Massachusetts, United States. At the 2020 census, the town population was 70, making it the least populous town in Massachusetts. Most of the residents live in the village of Cuttyhunk, while most of the land in the town is owned by the Forbes family.

History
The earliest inhabitants of the Elizabeth Islands were the Wampanoag Native Americans. The tribe did not settle permanently on the Elizabeth Islands, but used them in summer for hunting, fishing, and gardening. Occasionally, arrowheads or stone tools are discovered on the islands. The islands' names come from the Wampanoag language.

Bartholomew Gosnold was among the first Europeans to become aware of the Elizabeth Islands, including Cuttyhunk, in 1602. He and his crew attempted to establish a trading post on Cuttyhunk so that they could trade with the natives, the first attempt by Europeans to do so. The trading post was abandoned after only a few weeks, and Gosnold decided to return home. Upon his return to England, the British Crown claimed jurisdiction of the island chain.

Gosnold was first settled in 1641, the year of purchase of the islands by Thomas Mayhew, Sr. The islands were claimed by the Wampanoag until 1658, when the Wampanoag sachem transferred the deed of ownership to Mayhew. Constituting Dukes County, New York since 1683, the Elizabeth Islands, Martha's Vineyard, and Nantucket, were transferred to the newly created Province of Massachusetts Bay in 1691.  Gosnold was separately incorporated as a municipality in 1864; previously it was a part of the town of Chilmark.

Geography
Gosnold ranks 272nd out of the 351 communities in the Commonwealth in terms of land area; however, it has the longest distance between points within municipal limits of any town in the Commonwealth. It consists of the Elizabeth Islands, including Nonamesset Island, Uncatena Island, Naushon Island, Pasque Island, Nashawena Island, Penikese Island, Cuttyhunk Island, and several smaller islands. The string of islands extend roughly southwest of the southwestern tip of Falmouth, with the closest island, Nonamesset, being less than one-third of a mile away at its closest point. More than half the population lives on Cuttyhunk, with the majority of the rest living on Naushon.

Transportation
Cuttyhunk is served by Cuttyhunk Ferry Company from New Bedford. Service is daily in the warm months, and on Monday and Friday in the cooler months. There is also a water taxi service between New Bedford and Cuttyhunk.

Naushon Island is served by a private ferry from Woods Hole. Nonamesset and Uncatena are connected to Naushon Island via foot bridges.

Penikese Island is accessible via a chartered boat for STEM-related school trips.

All other islands in Gosnold do not have regular boat service and require a private vessel to be reached.

Demographics

As of the census of 2020, there were 70 people and 26 households residing in the town. The racial makeup of the town was 61 (87.14%) White, 3 (4.29%) Hispanic or Latino, 3 (4.29%) African Americans, Native Americans, and 5 (7.14%) from two or more races. The census did not report any Asians, or Pacific Islanders, and reported one person as Some Other Race.

In the town, the population was made up entirely of adults. 36.7% who were 65 years of age or older.

According to the 2010 Census, Gosnold now has the lowest population density of any town in the Commonwealth.  The title was previously held by Mount Washington at the southwest corner of Massachusetts.

Gosnold was first in a 2008 ranking of all Massachusetts communities in terms of total value of real estate per resident.

Government and politics

Government
On the national level, Gosnold is a part of Massachusetts's 9th congressional district, and is currently represented by Democrat Bill Keating. Massachusetts is currently represented in the United States Senate by senior Senator (Democrat) Elizabeth Warren and junior Senator (Democrat) Ed Markey.

On the state level, Gosnold is represented in the Massachusetts House of Representatives as a part of the Barnstable, Dukes and Nantucket district, which includes all of Martha's Vineyard and Nantucket, as well as a portion of Falmouth.  The town is represented in the Massachusetts Senate as a portion of the Cape and Islands district, which includes all of Martha's Vineyard, Nantucket and most of Barnstable County (with the exception of Bourne, Sandwich, and Falmouth).  All of Dukes County is patrolled by the Fifth (Oak Bluffs) Barracks of Troop D of the Massachusetts State Police.

Gosnold is governed on the local level by the open town meeting form of government, and is led by a board of selectmen.  Due to its geographic isolation and small population, the town has at times asked for a waiver from the Commonwealth from anti-nepotism laws.

Political affiliation

Politics

Education
The town has one schoolhouse, Cuttyhunk Elementary School. As of 2020, the school has no students. However, the town hopes to use the school as a STEM resource center for mainland schools to visit.

Penikese Island is home to The Penikese School. It operated as a private school for troubled boys until 2011. The school then became a substance abuse treatment center for a short time before converting into an educational facility for field trips.

Students who live on Naushon Island attend school in Falmouth. As of 2020, Naushon has one school-aged student who attends Falmouth Public Schools, making them the only student in the Town of Gosnold.

References

Further reading
The Cuttyhunk Historical Society. (2002). Images of America: Cuttyhunk and the Elizabeth Islands. Charleston, SC: Arcadia Publishing. .

External links

The Town of Gosnold, Dukes County Official Page
Images of Cuttyhunk Island
Images of Hadley's Harbor
Cuttyhunk Historical Society; The Museum of the Elizabeth Islands

 
Elizabeth Islands
Populated coastal places in Massachusetts
Towns in Dukes County, Massachusetts
Populated places established in 1641
1641 establishments in Massachusetts
Towns in Massachusetts